Lilium carniolicum, commonly called golden apple or Carniolan lily, is a lily native to the Balkans, as well as to Austria and northeastern Italy (Veneto + Friuli Venezia Giulia). The species is named after the historical region of Carniola, comprising parts of modern-day Slovenia, where it is most abundant.

Its flowers vary in colour from red to yellow, speckled on the bottom with black dots. The colour can vary even among flowers growing in the same locality. In general, yellow is predominant in the southern part of the range. There, the species is sometimes split into the closely related Lilium bosniacum, Lilium albanicum and Lilium jankae, but those are usually treated as varieties of Lilium carniolicum.

References

carniolicum
Flora of Southeastern Europe
Flora of the Alps
Flora of Austria
Biota of the Balkans
Carniola
Plants described in 1837